David Balp (born 3 March 1970) is a French weightlifter. He competed in the men's featherweight event at the 1992 Summer Olympics.

References

External links
 

1970 births
Living people
French male weightlifters
Olympic weightlifters of France
Weightlifters at the 1992 Summer Olympics
Sportspeople from Hérault
20th-century French people